During the 2012 American Express – TED Open doubles the defending champions of Carsten Ball and Andre Begemann decided not to participate.
Karol Beck and Lukáš Dlouhý won the final 3–6, 6–2, [10–6] against Adrián Menéndez and John Peers.

Seeds

Draw

Draw

References
 Main Draw

American Express - TED Open - Doubles
2012 Doubles